Pompeius of Pavia was Bishop of Pavia. It is believed that he may have suffered under Roman persecution, but he is not listed as a martyr.

References

290 deaths
Italian Roman Catholic saints
3rd-century Italian bishops
Bishops of Pavia
Year of birth unknown